The Trotuș is a river in eastern Romania, a right tributary of the river Siret. It emerges from the Ciuc Mountains in the Eastern Carpathians and joins the Siret in Domnești-Sat near Adjud after passing through Comănești and Onești in Bacău County.

Towns and villages

The following towns and villages are situated along the river Trotuș, from source to mouth: Lunca de Sus, Lunca de Jos, Ghimeș-Făget, Palanca, Agăș, Comănești, Dărmănești, Târgu Ocna, Onești, Adjud.

Tributaries

The following rivers are tributaries to the river Trotuș (from source to mouth):

Left: Gârbea, Valea Întunecoasă, Antaloc, Valea Rece, Bolovăniș, Tărhăuș, Șanț, Cuchiniș, Brusturoasa, Caminca, Șugura, Dracău, Agăș, Seaca, Ciungi, Asău, Urmeniș, Plopul, Larga, Cucuieți, Vâlcele, Gălian, Caraclău, Tazlău, Pârâul Mare

Right: Comiat, Bothavaș, Ugra, Boroș, Valea Capelei, Aldămaș, Popoiul, Ciugheș, Cotumba, Grohotiș, Sulța, Ciobănuș, Șopan, Uz, Dofteana, Slănic, Nicorești, Oituz, Cașin, Găureana, Gutinaș, Bogdana, Gârbovana, Căiuți, Popeni, Bâlca, Domoșița

References

External links 

Rivers of Romania
 
Rivers of Harghita County
Rivers of Bacău County
Rivers of Vrancea County